Unstoppable Love is a live album from Jesus Culture. Jesus Culture Music released the album on June 3, 2014.

Critical reception

Awarding the album four stars at CCM Magazine, Grace Aspinwall states, "Unstoppable Love is filled with passionate, soaring vocals". David Jeffries, rating the album three stars for AllMusic, writes, "it's the Jesus Culture album to grab when nothing but the most stately songs are what's required." Giving the album four and a half stars from New Release Today, Kevin Davis describes being, "impressed by the consistent quality and fresh worshipful songs that come from Jesus Culture." Stephen Luff, indicating in a nine out of ten review by Cross Rhythms, says, "The album delivers a set of worship songs of the highest quality and leaders Chris Quilala and Kim Walker-Smith have clearly lost none of their prophetic power." Signaling in a three and a half star review at Jesus Freak Hideout, Matthew Morris replies, "Jesus Culture's tenth album is one of their best." Jono Davies, specifying in a four and a half star review from Louder Than the Music, declares, "Jesus Culture have put together a stunning collection of songs of worship to the King of Kings whose love never stops." Assigning the album an eight and a half star review for Jesus Wired, Jessica Morris recognizes, "Unstoppable Love is a bold and riveting release by Jesus Culture."

Awards and accolades
This album was No. 15 on the ''Worship Leaders Top 20 Albums of 2014 list.

The song, "Unstoppable Love", was No. 15 on the Worship Leader'''s Top 20 Songs of 2014 list.

This album was No. 11, on the Worship Leaders Top 20 Albums of 2015 list.

Track listing

Chart performance

References 

2014 live albums
Jesus Culture albums